Luxembourg competed at the 2014 Summer Youth Olympics, in Nanjing, China from 16 August to 28 August 2014.

Medalists
Medals awarded to participants of mixed-NOC (Combined) teams are represented in italics. These medals are not counted towards the individual NOC medal tally.

Athletics

Luxembourg qualified one athlete.

Qualification Legend: Q=Final A (medal); qB=Final B (non-medal); qC=Final C (non-medal); qD=Final D (non-medal); qE=Final E (non-medal)

Girls
Field events

Judo

Luxembourg was given a quota to compete by the tripartite committee.

Individual

Team

Swimming

Luxembourg qualified two swimmers.

Girls

References

2014 in Luxembourgian sport
Nations at the 2014 Summer Youth Olympics
Luxembourg at the Youth Olympics